Sean Cattouse (born October 4, 1988) is a former American football free safety. He played college football at the University of California, Berkeley and attended Hubbard High School in Chicago, Illinois. He was also a member of the San Diego Chargers and Chicago Bears of the National Football League (NFL).

Professional career
Cattouse was signed by the NFL's San Diego Chargers on April 30, 2012, after going undrafted in the 2012 NFL Draft. He made his NFL debut on December 30, 2012, against the Oakland Raiders. He was released by the Chargers on August 30, 2013.

Cattouse spent the 2013 season with the Chicago Bears of the NFL. He was released by the Bears on June 19, 2014.

Personal life
Cattouse began to work as a physical education teacher at Muchin College Prep during the 2015–16 school year. He currently is a physical education teacher at Rauner College Prep High School in Chicago.

References

External links
Just Sports Stats

Living people
1988 births
Players of American football from Chicago
American football safeties
California Golden Bears football players
San Diego Chargers players
Chicago Bears players